Jonathan Malangu Kuminga (born October 6, 2002) is a Congolese professional basketball player for the Golden State Warriors of the National Basketball Association (NBA). A consensus five-star recruit and the top small forward in the 2021 class, he chose to forgo his college eligibility and reclassify to the 2020 class to join the NBA G League Ignite. Kuminga finished his high school career at The Patrick School in Hillside, New Jersey.

The Warriors selected Kuminga with the seventh overall pick in the 2021 NBA draft. During his rookie season, he won an NBA championship with the team.

Early life
Kuminga began playing basketball in the Democratic Republic of the Congo at age two. In 2016, he moved to the U.S. to play high school basketball.

High school career
As a freshman, Kuminga played basketball for Huntington Prep School in Huntington, West Virginia. For his sophomore season, he transferred to Our Savior New American School in Centereach, New York and averaged 25 points, five rebounds, and five assists per game. In January 2019, Kuminga was named most valuable player of the Slam Dunk to the Beach showcase after scoring 40 points, a single-game record at the event, in a loss to Gonzaga College High School. He earned MaxPreps National Sophomore of the Year honors. After the season, Kuminga averaged 20.8 points, 5.2 rebounds and 3.3 assists per game for the NY Rens at the Nike Elite Youth Basketball League, facing many players older than him. He scored 43 points, shooting 7 of 11 from three-point range, against the Texas Titans, a team featuring top recruits Cade Cunningham and Greg Brown.

For his junior season, Kuminga transferred to The Patrick School in Hillside, New Jersey. On December 23, 2019, he made his season debut, scoring 20 points in a win over Roselle Catholic High School, after having been ruled ineligible for 30 days by the New Jersey State Interscholastic Athletic Association due to transfer rules. On January 3, 2020, Kuminga suffered an ankle sprain that sidelined him for about a month. As a junior, he averaged 16.2 points, 5.5 rebounds and 3.7 assists per game.

Recruiting
As a high school sophomore, Kuminga emerged as one of the best recruits in the 2021 class, with most recruiting services ranking him first in his class by the time he was a junior. On July 15, 2020, he reclassified to the 2020 class and announced that he would bypass college basketball to join the NBA G League Ignite over offers from Texas Tech, Auburn, Duke and Kentucky, among other college programs. At the end of his high school career, he was a consensus five-star recruit and the best small forward in the 2020 class. He was considered the third-best player in his class by Rivals.com and the fourth-best by 247Sports.com and ESPN after reclassifying .

Professional career

NBA G League Ignite (2020–2021)
On July 15, 2020, Kuminga signed a one-year contract with the NBA G League Ignite, a developmental team affiliated with the NBA G League. On February 10, 2021, he made his debut, recording 19 points, four assists and four rebounds in a 110–104 win over the Santa Cruz Warriors. Kuminga averaged 15.8 points, 7.2 rebounds and 2.7 assists per game.

Golden State Warriors (2021–present)
The Golden State Warriors drafted Kuminga as the 7th pick in the 2021 NBA draft. On August 3, 2021, he signed with the Warriors. On October 30, Kuminga made his NBA debut, putting up three points and one steal in a 103–82 win over the Oklahoma City Thunder. On December 18, in his first career start, Kuminga put up a career-high 26 points in a 119–100 loss to the Toronto Raptors. On February 18, 2022, Kuminga participated in the Rising Stars Challenge game for the 2022 NBA All-Star Game weekend, replacing the injured Chris Duarte. Kuminga ended his rookie season as an NBA champion after the Warriors defeated the Boston Celtics in the 2022 NBA Finals. At 19 years and 253 days, he became the second youngest NBA champion, behind Darko Miličić.

National team career 
In August 2022, Kuminga joined the DR Congo men's national basketball team for the African 2023 World Cup qualifiers. His older brother, Joel Ntambwe, was also on the roster. On August 26, 2022, he scored a team-high 18 points along with 6 rebounds for Congo in a 69–71 loss to Cameroon.

Player profile
Kuminga is able to defend multiple positions and has elite potential to be a lockdown defender, with his near 7' wingspan and 6'8" feet height plus natural strength and speed. He slashes to the rim well, and has great scoring potential but is however a poor shooter. He also shows great potential to be a ball-handler, pointed to as one of the key players to extend the Warriors' dynasty. His passing vision improved in his rookie season. He has learned from teammates with him singling out Andre Iguodala and Draymond Green for their advice and his observing their performance.

Career statistics

NBA

Regular season

|-
| style="text-align:left;background:#afe6ba;"|†
| style="text-align:left;"| Golden State
| 70 || 12 || 16.9 || .513 || .336 || .684 || 3.3 || .9 || .4 || .3 || 9.3
|- class="sortbottom"
| style="text-align:center;" colspan="2"| Career
| 70 || 12 || 16.9 || .513 || .336 || .684 || 3.3 || .9 || .4 || .3 || 9.3

Playoffs

|-
| style="text-align:left;background:#afe6ba;"|2022†
| style="text-align:left;"| Golden State
| 16 || 3 || 8.6 || .500 || .231 || .769 || 1.7 || .5 || .2 || .1 || 5.2
|- class="sortbottom"
| style="text-align:center;" colspan="2"| Career
| 16 || 3 || 8.6 || .500 || .231 || .769 || 1.7 || .5 || .2 || .1 || 5.2

Personal life 
Kuminga's older brother, Joel Ntambwe, played college basketball for UNLV before transferring to Texas Tech in 2019. Two of his cousins play professional basketball: Emmanuel Mudiay in the NBA, and Omari Gudul in Europe. Kuminga's first language is French, and he is continuing to learn English.

References

External links
NBA G League profile

2002 births
Living people
21st-century Democratic Republic of the Congo people
Democratic Republic of the Congo expatriate basketball people in the United States
Democratic Republic of the Congo men's basketball players
Golden State Warriors draft picks
Golden State Warriors players
NBA G League Ignite players
The Patrick School alumni
Sportspeople from Goma
Power forwards (basketball)
Santa Cruz Warriors players
Small forwards